The Ukrainian Catholic Eparchy of the Imaculada Conceição in Prudentópolis (or Imaculada Conceição in Prudentópolis of the Ukrainians) is a Ukrainian Greek Catholic (Byzantine Rite, Ukrainian language) eparchy (diocese) in the ecclesiastical province of the Metropolitan Archeparchy of São João Batista em Curitiba, who has no other suffragan, dependent on the Roman Congregation for the Eastern Churches.

Its cathedral episcopal see is Catedral Ucraniana Nossa Senhora da Imaculada Conceição, in Prudentópolis, Paraná, currently held by Eparch (Bishop) Meron Mazur, O.S.B.M.

It comprises twelve churches, constituting Ukrainian Catholic parishes in the Southern part of Brazil, concurrently with various Latin provinces.

History 
Established on 2014.05.12, as Eparchy (Eastern Catholic Diocese) of Imaculada Conceição in Prudentópolis (without pre-diocesan stage), on Brazilian territory split off from the then Diocese of São João Batista em Curitiba, which was simultaneously promoted Archeparchy and remains its Metropolitan Archdiocese.

Ordinaries 
Suffragan Eparchial Bishops of Imaculada Conceição in Prudentópolis
 Meron Mazur, Basilian Order of Saint Josaphat (O.S.B.M.) (12 May 2014 - ... ), previously Titular Bishop of Simitthu & Auxiliary Bishop of São João Batista em Curitiba (2005.12.21 – 2014.05.12)

References

External links 
  GCatholic.org, with incumbent biography links and Google map
 Profile at Catholic Hierarchy 

Imaculada Conceicao in Prudentopolis
Eastern Catholic dioceses in Brazil
2014 establishments in Brazil